The Commission on the History of the October Revolution and the Russian Communist Party (Bolsheviks), also known as Ispart (Russian: Истпарт), was a research institute that collected, processed, archived and published history of the Communist Party of the Soviet Union and the October Revolution.

History 
The commission for the History of the Party was established under the State Publishing House of the RSFSR. On 21 September 1920 the Council of People's Commissars adopted a resolution "On the establishment of a commission for collecting and studying materials on the history of the October Revolution and the history of the RCP". At the suggestion of Mikhail Olminsky, the commission received the abbreviated name "Istpart". After the adoption of the decree, Istpart operated under the People's Commissariat of Education, on 1 December 1921, it was transferred to the Central Committee of the RCP (b) as a department.

Istpart was headed by a board of managers (since 1924 - the council). Daily management of its work was carried out by the Presidium: the chairman Olminsky, his deputy M. N. Pokrovsky and the secretary V. V. Adoratsky. The Istpart consisted of 2 subcommissions: on the history of the "Great Socialist October Revolution" (headed by M. N. Pokrovsky) and on the history of the party (headed by V. I. Nevsky). At first, the Istpart consisted of 9 people appointed by the SNK, later its composition was increased. The decision of the Central Committee of the RCP (b) of 3 December 1921 determined the states of the central Istpart should be composed of sixty people and each local bureau two people.

Istpart was given the right to organize local bureaus on the territory of the RSFSR and all union republics. In the largest cities, in the union republics and regions in the 1920s. In the "Regulations on the Istpartition departments under the provincial committees of the RCP (b)", approved by the Central Committee of the RCP (b) (circular of the Central Committee of the RCP (b) No. 27 of 10 August 1923), it was indicated that their task was to "collect and study materials on the history of the October Revolution on the territory of this province and the history of this provincial party organization." Istaprt published over 30 magazines and various collections. Since 1921 Istpart published the journal Proletarian Revolution and Bulletin of Istpart, since 1922 the Petrograd Bureau of Istpart has published the journal Krasnaya Chronicle, Istpart of the Central Committee of the Communist Party (b) of Ukraine published Annals of the Revolution, the Kazan Bureau of Istpart published Ways of Revolution.

The Istpart archive was created in April 1924 and by the end of the 1920s. composed more than 60,000 documents, including magazines and brochures, proclamations and decrees, newspapers. It included funds from the library and archives of the Russian Social Democratic Labour Party and the GA Kuklin Library in Geneva.

By resolutions of the Central Committee of the All-Union Communist Party (Bolsheviks) dated 10 May and 20 August 1928, Istpart was merged with the Lenin Institute. The network of local Istpars were reduced from 100 to 26, the largest of them by 1931 were transformed into research institutes of the history of the party. The Istpart continued to function as a scientific department of the Lenin Institute (1928-1931). From 1931 to 1939, the department of the Marx-Engels-Lenin Institute, which carried out scientific and methodological work, directed and controlled the activities of local branches and institutes. The journal Proletarian Revolution was published until 1941 as an organ of the MELI under the Central Committee of the All-Union Communist Party (Bolsheviks).

On 2 December 1939 the Central Committee of the All-Union Communist Party (Bolsheviks) adopted a resolution "On local party archives and institutions of Istpart", which transferred party archives from the jurisdiction of the Marx-Engels-Lenin Institute (MELI) to the direct subordination of the corresponding regional committees, regional committees and the Central Committee of the Communist Parties of the Union republics. Regional Istparts were abolished, and their functions and documentation were transferred to the party archives.

Since 1924 Istpart took an active part in the struggle of the leadership of the Central Committee against internal party oppositions. Thus, its leader Mikhakl Olminsky, published a letter from Leon Trotsky, written during the First World War, which was used to discredit the Left Opposition.

References

Bodies of the Communist Party of the Soviet Union
Research institutes in the Soviet Union
Central Committee of the Communist Party of the Soviet Union
1920 establishments in Russia
History of the Communist Party of the Soviet Union